Parnassius arcticus, the Siberian Apollo, is a high-altitude butterfly which is found in Northeastern Yakutia, Russia. It is a member of the snow Apollo genus (Parnassius) of the swallowtail family, Papilionidae.

The taxonomic status of this butterfly is uncertain. It was originally described from females only as a Siberian subspecies of Parnassius simo, a species which does not occur in Siberia. Eisner, the author of the subspecies later decided it was conspecific with Parnassius tenedius. Korshunov & Gorbunov (1995) regard it as a good (full) species with ammosovi Korshunov as a junior synonym.

P. ammasovi lives on scree at 1,500 m. The adult flies mid-June to early July. Eggs are laid on stones around the host plant, Corydalis gorodkovi.

External links

Goran Waldeck's Parnassius of the World
SZMN Holotype and paratype of ammosovi (sic)
Parnassius arcticus on Rusinsects (text and photographs).

arcticus
Butterflies described in 1968